The Dark Peak and The White is the fourth album by folk singer Bella Hardy, released in 2012. The album was produced by Kris Drever.

Track listing

Personnel
 Bella Hardy - Vocals, Fiddle, Piano, Harmonium & Feet
 Kris Drever - Guitar, Mandolin, Vocals, Double Bass, Slide Guitar & Feet
 Emma Hardy - Vocals on Castleton Gypsies & Peak Rhapsody
 Rachel Newton - Vocals on Castleton Gypsies
 Laura-Beth Salter - Vocals on Castleton Gypsies

References

External links
 Album info on the official website

2012 albums